Charles Peter Henry Morgan is the former managing director of the Morgan Motor Company, a UK car manufacturer.

The grandson of the founder of the company, H.F.S. Morgan, and the son of the company's former chairman Peter Morgan, Charles Morgan joined the family firm full-time in 1985. Previously he had worked for 10 years as a news cameraman for ITN and then briefly in the publishing industry. After the Morgan Motor Company was featured on the BBC's Troubleshooter in 1991, he obtained an MBA. In 2013, he was removed as Morgan's managing director and continued as strategy director until October 2013, when he was voted off the company's board. He remains a minority shareholder.

Bibliography

References

Living people
Place of birth missing (living people)
English businesspeople
1951 births